Šárka Nováková (née Makówková; born 21 February 1971 in Zlín, Czechoslovakia) is a retired Czech high jumper.

She finished thirteenth at the 1991 World Indoor Championships and ninth at the 1991 World Championships. She then competed at the 1992 Olympic Games, 1993 World Championships and the 1995 World Indoor Championships without reaching the final.

Her personal best jump was 1.95 metres, achieved in 1992.

References

1971 births
Living people
Sportspeople from Zlín
Czech female high jumpers
Czechoslovak female high jumpers
Olympic athletes of Czechoslovakia
Athletes (track and field) at the 1992 Summer Olympics
World Athletics Championships athletes for Czechoslovakia
World Athletics Championships athletes for the Czech Republic